The Public Security Police Force (abbreviated ) is the non-criminal police department of Macau and a branch of the Macau Security Force. Originally known at first as the Macau Police, the force went through several name changes before taking on its current name. The PSP celebrates its foundation on 14 March 1691.

Due to the one country, two systems perspective, it is organisationally separate from the mainland authorities. CPSPM is organisationally independent from the jurisdiction of the mainland's Public Security Ministry.

The force is currently headed by Ng Kam Wa since December 20, 2019.

History 

Law enforcement was first taken by the military stationed in Portuguese Macau, with Portuguese Navy troops at first before the Portuguese Army stepped in to take over internal security duties on 14 March 1691. A small garrison was raised to conduct police work at first, but had the majority of its duties taken over by Portuguese India-based soldiers in 1784. On May 13, 1810, the Prince Regent Battalion was created to be the colony's police force, consisting of four companies of 400 men. Two companies were based at the Customs House while the other two was based at Fortaleza do Monte (Mount Fortress).

On March 3, 1841, a royal decree had approved the creation of a permanent police force, which was staffed by Macanese citizens who were not part of the battalion. A group of night watchmen called the Guard's Bazar was created by Bernardino de Senna Fernandes with some assistance from local Macanese Chinese to patrol residential areas at night, which was recognized as a legal law enforcement body by the Portuguese Macau government. With an initial count of 50 men, it was soon raised with 100 men. In 1861, the governor passed an ordinance that renamed the force from Macau Police to the Macau Police Force (Abbreviation: CPM). In 1862, the CPM was given the power to patrol the colony's waters through Ordinance No. 56, November 18, 1862 under 1868 when the role was assigned to the Macau Port Police (Abbreviation: PPM). Moors were recruited into the ranks in 1873 with a Moor section established on August 9, 1874.

Governor Eugenio Carlos Correa da Silva dissolved the CPM on January 18, 1879, replacing it with the Macau Police Guard (Abbreviation: GPM). They were based at the Barracks San Francisco as part of the GPM's establishment. In 1912, Provincial Ordinance no. 106, June 10, 1912 had called for the GPM to be led by a county administrator, being assisted by both staff and police officers alike. Daniel Ferreira, the county administrator in 1914, created the police force's civil branch with a strength of 300 officers. A security police branch was established in 1916, with a strength of 304 officers paid with a salary of 7,810 MOP.

The post of Police Commissioner of Public Security in Macau was made separate from the colony administrator under Executive Order 533 in 1937, with the creation of the PSP (modelled after the Portuguese Homeland PSP) at first under the command of a captain or a lieutenant in the Portuguese Army. The PSP's police band was created in 1951 under Luis Augusto de Matos Paletti to serve as the force's ceremonial unit in official events. A social recovery center was created in 1961 to help take care of troubled people such as orphans, homeless or foreign nationals living in Macau without any permanent residence. By May 1968, the PSP served as a military organization under the Portuguese colonial government. Female officers were first recruited by the PSP on October 7, 1974 when 42 candidates were accepted into service. Decree-Law No. 705/75 of December 27, 1975 placed the PSP under the Security Forces of Macau alongside the Marine Police, Fiscal Police and the Fire Department.

Further restructuring of the PSP took place in 1981 when Decree No. 37/81/M was passed to amend the earlier Decree No. 22/77/M. It established the PSP's divisions consisting of Command, Division of Police Macau Police Division of the Isles, Police Tactical Intervention Unit, Division of Transit Services, Migration and Identity, Music Band, Center for Recovery and Social Welfare. The PSP's Police School was created on July 18, 1982 with Portuguese officers serving as the institution's first instructors. Another round of restructuring took place on February 8, 1986 with the passing of Decree-Law No. 13/86/M, which created additional PSP divisions, consisting of Command, General Staff and Command organs, Divisions of Police and General Support, Organs Support Services and Education.

Ending of Portuguese rule
In 1995, the PSP went through a third phrase of restructuring through the passing of Decree-Law No. 3/95/M, defining its overall structure consisting of Command and Control Bodies, Department of Resource Management, Department Information, Operations Department, Migration Service, Transit Department, Macau Police Department, Islands Police Departments, Police Tactical Intervention Unit, Training Command, Police Academy and the Music Band. Portuguese-born PSP officers began leaving their posts also at the same year, being replaced by Macanese-born PSP officers.

In 1999, Lieutenant Colonel Manuel António Meireles de Carvalho passed on command of the PSP to its new commander, Superintendent General Jose Proença Branco. With the transfer of sovereignty on December 20 of that year, the PSP changed its emblem, replacing the former Portuguese coat of arms with that of the Emblem of Macau. Contemporary media reports recorded that PSP personnel substituted their new cap badges for the former Portuguese
insignia precisely at the moment of changeover.

The PSP's Police School moved its location from its old headquarters at the Center for Social Recovery and began work on the Academy of Security Forces at Coloane after the People's Liberation Army Macau Garrison was created in Macau in May 2000.

Superintendent General Jose Proenca Branco was replaced by Superintendent Law Siu Peng after former Macau Chief Executive Edmund Ho Hau Wah on September 17, 2001 passed Decree No. 66/2001.

SAR control

In 2017, the PSPFM established the Tourism Police unit.

On April 8, 2019, the force announced that Vong Vai Hong, the Assistant Commissioner was appointed as the Deputy Commissioner. On October 9, 2019, Assistant Commissioner Leong Heng Hong was made the Deputy Commissioner.

Controversies
The PSPFM's credibility suffered in the 2007 Macau labour protest when a bystander was injured from a bullet fired by PSPM officers as warning shots to break up protests.

The PSPFM announced that several of its officers, including a retired officer, were arrested during an anti-extortion operation.

Vehicles

All marked vehicles employed by the PSP have an all blue finish with the seal of the force. Previously, all of them had a white finish.

Some of the vehicles used or are currently in use:

 Honda Civic – patrol car
 Hyundai Santa Fe – patrol car
 Mazda 3 – patrol car
 Toyota Corolla – patrol car
 Suzuki Carry – lorry
 Toyota LiteAce light van
 Honda VFR800P motorcycle
 BMW R-series RTP motorcycle
 Toyota Hiace van
 Toyota Townace Van
 Mitsubishi Outlander SUV

Organization 
The PSPFM is currently organized according to the following structure as of 2021:

 Resources Management Department
 Human Resources Division
 Material Resources Division
 Financial Resources Office
 Information Department
 Research and Information Division 
 Commissioner of General Issues
 Operations Department
 Operations and Communications Division
 Public Relations Division
 Migration Service – acts as immigration services
 Immigration Division
 Frontier Control Division
 Traffic Department
 Traffic Control Commission
 Traffic Commission for Macau Peninsula
 Traffic Commission for the Islands
 Police Department for Macau Peninsula 
 Police Department for the Islands
 Airport Division
 Police Tactical Intervention Unit
 Special Operations Group
 Police School
 Support Division and Services

Rank structure

Senior Command 
The PSP is commanded by a superintendent-general, who is assisted by two superintendents.

Other positions or offices in the PSP organization includes:
 Legal Advisor
 Discipline Counsel
 Support Office Command

Individual departments are often headed by a commissioner.

Ranks 
The various categories, ranks and respective main functions are:

 Senior ranks
 Superintendent-General (superintendente-geral): commander of the CPSP,
 Superintendent (superintendente): deputy commander of the CPSP,
 Intendent (intendente): commanding officer of level I units,
 Sub-Intendent (subintendente): commanding officer of level II units,
 Commissioner (comissário): commanding officer of level III units,
 Sub-commissioner (subcomissário): commanding officer of level IV units,
 Chief (chefe): commanding officer of level V units,
 Sub-Chief (subchefe): coordinator of complex tasks;

 Basic ranks
 Principal constable (guarda principal): coordinator of simple tasks,
 Constable first class (guarda de primeira): executor of operational, technical or administrative tasks,
 Constable (guarda): executor of operational, technical or administrative tasks.

Rank insignia 
The rank insignia of the CPSP follows the generic model of the Portuguese Public Security Police. Insignia is placed in dark blue epaulets for all ranks, except those of superintendent and superintendent general which use instead red epaulets.

The insignia for basic ranks consist in silver chevrons: two for constable, three for constable first class and four for principal constable. The insignia for sub-chief consists in a silver stripe. The insignia for chiefs and commissioners consist of a laurel branch and a number of PSP stars (six points silver stars with the "SP" monogram in the center): one for chief, two for sub-commissioner and three (in inverted triangle) for commissioner. The insignia for intendents and superintendents consist of two crossed batons surrounded by laurel wreaths and a number of PSP stars: two for sub-intendent, three (in inverted triangle) for intendent and superintendent and four for superintendent general.

Firearms 

The standard issue sidearm for regular Macau police officers are issued the Smith & Wesson Model 10 revolver.

Policemen who work for special units such as Police Intervention Tactical Unit (UTIP) or the Special Operation Group (GOE) are issued with the Glock 19 semi-auto pistol. The GOE may also equip with SIG Sauer P226, SIG Sauer P228, Heckler & Koch MP5 if meet certain requirements.

For long arms, the standard sub-machine guns of Macau Police are Heckler & Koch MP5, Brügger & Thomet MP9, Remington 870 shotguns along with Federal M201-Z tear gas launchers are also one of the regular equipment.

The Tourism Police unit are issued the Glock 19 semi-auto pistol as a special forces group within the CPSP along with the special patrol group.

The UTIP and GOE would use small arms unique to the Portuguese FBP m/948, such as the SIG SG 552 short assault rifle, Franchi SPAS-15 semi-automatic shotgun and the SIG-Sauer SSG 3000 sniper rifle. They also use Smith & Wesson-made 37 mm gas launchers, long batons and Flash-ball and taser for less-than-lethal to control riots.

See also 
 Public Security Police of Mainland China
 Hong Kong Police Force

References

Further reading

External links 

 Official Site 

Law enforcement agencies of Macau
Border guards
Immigration services
1691 establishments in the Portuguese Empire
17th-century establishments in Macau